Spilomicrini is a tribe of parasitoid wasps.

Genera
 Atomopria
 Bruchopria
 Chilomicrus
 Doddius
 Entomacis
 Epomium
 Ferrugenus
 Idiotypa
 Neurogalesus
 Paramesius
 Pentapria
 Poecilopsilus
 Rostropria
 Spilomicrus
 Xenismarus

References

Parasitica
Parasitic wasps
Diapriidae
Hymenoptera tribes